Kerenina Sunny Halim (also spelled Karenina; born in Jakarta, 13 June 1986), an Indonesian American, was Miss Indonesia (DKI Jakarta) 2009. She represented Indonesia at the Miss World 2009 in South Africa in November–December the same year.

Kerenina is of mixed descent, her mother is from Montana, United States and her father from Bandung, Indonesia, she has five siblings, and is number four in a family of six children.

Education 
Kerenina attended a Christian Boarding School in her early years from grade school until her senior high school graduation, and in her teen years actively participated in several humanitarian projects throughout the Indonesian archipelago. By the age of 22, Kerenina had received long-distance certificates in Marketing, Childhood Psychology and Teaching, Home Economics, and Contemporary Arts, all of which were issued by Christian Vocational Academy, a long-distance learning institution.

In her last year of high school, Kerenina completed a performing arts course while she lived in Denpasar, Bali. She performed with a modern contemporary arts dance troupe which participated in several competitions, and attained first place in the Jakarta Arts festival 2001. In addition, she also took a music course in drums, and attended vocals lessons. During her first year of college, she spent a year in India, where she helped to set up a school for deaf children. She also played an active role in consolidating women's rights in the women's correctional institute in New Delhi.

Early Years Career 
At the age of 21, she moved out on her own and began to work independently, teaching for the next two years on subjects such a Character building and child psychology at a grade school in Jakarta, Sekolah Mentari. Kerenina also spent her spare time doing various TV commercials and modelling jobs, such as catwalks at fashion shows and photo spreads for fashion magazines. In April 2009, she auditioned for the Miss Indonesia 2009 competition and was selected as one of the 33 finalists to compete for the Miss Indonesia 2009 title. Kerenina was chosen to be the representative from DKI Jakarta and along with 32 other finalists began the two weeks quarantine preparation program leading up to the grand final event of the competition. Kerenina went on to win the title and was crowned a Miss Indonesia 2009, at the grand finale event on 5 June 2009.

Within the same year Kerenina was also sent as the representative of Indonesia to compete in the Miss World competition, in November and December 2009. And was the first Indonesian ever to win top scores in all 5 Fast Track competitions of the miss world competition.

Career 
Kerenina is currently a young budding career woman and entrepreneur, and active in several charity and humanitarian organisations focusing on Education and Healthcare for underprivileged children around Indonesia.

Kerenina is co-founder and partner of OYA Clinics Indonesia, a Medical and Healthcare Clinic located in Taman Sari Semanggi, South Jakarta and operating under the medical license of Yayasan Rumah Sakit MH Thamrin.

OYA Clinic provides general healthcare services, Aesthetic services and treatments, an in-house Dental Clinic and IV Drip facilities for hangover and Sports applications, and Women and Children specialised healthcare services, as well as a developing Lab tests service for Hormone testing and Gut Flora imbalances.

OYA Clinic also has a Humanitarian Aid project called OYA Peduli where they launched a Vaccine Campaign to provide free vaccine services for underprivileged children throughout Indonesia, and regularly help with free medical screening and medicinal care for orphaned and street children around Jakarta, Indonesia.

Kerenina is also Head Of Corporate Communication in MFUN an ICO for the gaming industry and traded on the INDODAX and Cryptocurrency Exchange (MFUNN MOBILE MEDIA PRIVATE LIMITED) from January 2018 – Present.

Kerenina is also an entrepreneur and investor in IMP Minerals, an open surface mine with high grade deposits of Lead, Zinc, Copper, Silver (PT Indo Mineralita Prima) from March 2018 – Present. (https://www.impminerals.com)

Early Years Humanitarian Aid Programs and Charitable Projects 
Kerenina spent her first year of college in India, where she helped to set up a school for deaf children. She also played an active role in consolidating women's rights in the women's correctional institute in New Delhi. Kerenina then returned to Indonesia and helped build a School and Living Center in Solo, Central Java for the displaced children from Ambon where they were relocated to after the unrest and civil war in Ambon, in which most of the children lost their parents or several members of their family.

In the aftermath of the catastrophic tsunami in Aceh in December 2004, Kerenina spent much of the following two years helping to rebuild Aceh. Being active in one of the first response disaster relief teams, she also, with the help of other organisations, founded projects such as, educational programs for the children in the displaced persons camps, organising the building and donating of over 100 fishing boats to the fishing villages within and surrounding Banda Aceh. She was key in the development of a mobile clinic project which provided the first and only free mobile health service in the area at that time, bringing free medical care and medicine to 15 villages within the Aceh region.
>

Humanitarian Aid Organisations and Charitable Foundations 
Kerenina is also co-founder of Yayasan Let's Share Indonesia. A charitable organisation founded by Kerenina and her two partners in 2014. Yayasan Let's Share is based in Jakarta, Indonesia focused on providing education and healthcare throughout Indonesia.

Kerenina is also partner in Project Kooka, an initiative using Art for Charity, to fund education fees and scholarships for orphaned and street children throughout Jakarta, Indonesia. This project was established by Kerenina and her partner in 2017, which then went on to fund the building of a kindergarten school in west Sumba called Sekolah PAUD Melati I, in conjunction with Happy Hearts Foundation and Yayasan Putra Peduli. The school was launched and remains in operation since its official opening in January 2019.

Kerenina also co-founded and manages OYA Clinic's Humanitarian Aid project called OYA Peduli where they launched a Vaccine Campaign to provide free vaccine services for underprivileged children throughout Indonesia, and regularly help with free medical screening and medicinal care for orphaned and street children around Jakarta, Indonesia.

Certification 
Kerenina is an Advanced Padi Certified AOW Diver, and has been avidly traveling and diving all over Indonesia. Kerenina received her Open Water Certification from Padi Dive Center in Indonesia in 2013, and began diving seriously since January 2018 to date. Kerenina currently holds a log of over 260 dives, and has dived in various locations and dive spots around Indonesia such as Raja Ampat, Labuan Bajo, Pulau Komodo, NTT, Nusa Penida, Crystal Bay, Bali, Morotai, Banda Neira, Bunaken, Manado, Pulo Cinta, Gorontalo, Gili, and Lombok.

Competitions 
Kerenina became a member of Bengkel Crossfit in January 2018 in Jakarta, Indonesia, and competed in her first International competition Called the Crossfit Open in April 2018, although she didn't finish due to a back injury she placed 14th overall for Woman's Scaled Category for the country of Indonesia. Later in the year, Kerenina participated in the yearly Regionals competition called the Crossfit Wod-off in September 2018. Kerenina competed in the Teams category and got 16th place. Kerenina also competed in the Annual JIS Crossfit Competition for Charity, this time she placed 6th in the Teams Category.

Miss Indonesia's CROWN
Kerenina Sunny Halim is successor incumbent from 5 June 2009 to 1 June 2010 (only 1 year holding the crown) and her crown was given to Miss Indonesia 2010.

Achievements in Miss World 2009
In Miss Sport, although unplaced. Her team won gold medals.
In Miss Beauty with a purpose, she was placed in the top 5
In Miss Talent, she placed in top 10.
In Beach beauty, she became first Indonesian delegates in Miss World called as semifinalist and placed in top 12.

References

Living people
1986 births
Indonesian beauty pageant winners
American people of Chinese descent
Indo people
Indonesian people of Chinese descent
Indonesian Christians
Miss Indonesia winners
Miss World 2009 delegates
People from Jakarta
Indonesian people of American descent
American people of Indonesian descent
American Christians
Members of The Family International